Aija Barča (born 26 October 1949) is a Latvian pedagogue and  politician and a Deputy of the Saeima in 1998-2002 and since 2006. She was elected from the social democratic list in the 7th Saeima, from People's Party in the 9th and from the Union of Greens and Farmers in the 10th and 11th.

References

1949 births
Living people
People from Ventspils Municipality
Latvian Green Party politicians
Latvian Social Democratic Workers' Party politicians
People's Party (Latvia) politicians
Liepāja Party politicians
Deputies of the 7th Saeima
Deputies of the 9th Saeima
Deputies of the 10th Saeima
Deputies of the 11th Saeima
Deputies of the 12th Saeima
Women deputies of the Saeima
University of Liepāja alumni
21st-century Latvian women politicians
20th-century Latvian women politicians